Diamante Music Group was a Newport Beach, California-based independent record label distributor active from 1993 through 2004. Diamante was home to several dozen small independent record labels, some of whose artists later gained worldwide recognition.

Among such were Rescue Records whose releases for San Diego-based artists P.O.D.'s Snuff the Punk and Brown and Tonéx's Pronounced Toe-Nay, who later signed contracts with Atlantic Records and Jive Records respectively, elevating the desire for the Rescue Records releases. Another notable Diamante-distributed label is Tooth & Nail Records whose artists Thousand Foot Krutch and MxPx first rose to prominence as independents. Multiple Dove Award winner Crystal Lewis made Diamante Music Group home for her independent label Metro One Music. Diamante was also home to N'Soul Records, the boutique label of Christian dance music pioneer Scott Blackwell and the Nitro Praise series.

In 2001, it was merged with The Butterfly Group, a record label collective of the Christian music industry started by Mike Rinaldi and Bob Carlisle, to become Diamante-Butterfly Group, LLC. The company consolidated its operations to Nashville, Tennessee in 2003. Though numerous attempts had been made to resuscitate the independent distribution channel in the Christian music market, Diamante-Butterfly filed for chapter 11 bankruptcy in 2004 and was sold to CNI Distribution.

In 2006 Syntax Records purchased the remaining assets of what was known as the Butterfly Group which included three P.O.D., titles, six Winan's titles, and many more before parting some of it out to other companies including their new distribution partner Koch Entertainment.

Partial list of distributed labels

 5 Minute Walk Records
 Against the Flow Records
 AIR Gospel
 Alarma Records
 Bettie Rocket Records
 Blonde Vinyl
 Cross Movement Records
 Eternal Funk Records
 Faith MD Music
 Galaxy 21 Music
 Grapetree Records
 Grrr Records
 Holy Roller Entertainment
 Insync Music
 JDI Records
 KMG Records
 Lion of Zion Entertainment
 MCM Music
 Metal Blade Records
 Metro One Music
 Micah Records
 MYX Records
 N'Soul Records
 Only God Entertainment
 Rescue Records
 Resolve Records
 Rhythm House Records
 Rocket Dog Records
 Rowe Productions
 Rustproof Records
 Screaming Giant Records
 Seventh Street Records
 Shabach Entertainment
 Syntax Records
 The Acappella Company
 Tooth & Nail Records

References

See also
 List of record labels

Record labels established in 1993
Record labels disestablished in 2004
Record label distributors
American independent record labels
Christian record labels